The Pietà Gonfalon (Italian - Gonfalone con la Pietà) is a c. 1472 tempera on canvas painting by Pietro Perugino, now in the Galleria Nazionale dell'Umbria in Perugia. It was produced as a gonfalon or processional banner for the Franciscan monastery at Farneto, near Perugia. It is an early work by the artist and shows the Pietà.

References

Paintings by Pietro Perugino
1470s paintings
Collections of the Galleria Nazionale dell'Umbria
Paintings of the Pietà